The Listies are Richard Higgins and Matt Kelly, a double act from Melbourne, Australia who make live comedy and theatre and TV for "kidults" they also write and illustrate children's books. Forming in 2008 as an alternative comedy and variety act called "The List Operators" (named for their 'list making' schtick) they won the Melbourne Comedy festival's best independent show award (The 'Gibbo') and toured extensively, including the Edinburgh Fringe Festival and Dublin Fringe Festival. They began to make work for young audiences in 2010 with a show called 'More Fun than a wii!', which went on to be the first kids' show ever to be nominated for the Melbourne International Comedy Festival best show award, Barry Award (for comedy). They have since been described as "cult figures in the children’s theatre world."

The Listies regularly tour festivals in Australia and further afield and were the recipients of the Best Production for Children award at the Sydney Theatre Awards in 2013, they were nominated for this award again in 2016.

They have made seven stage shows for children, two for adult audiences, released two albums and written and illustrated three books (published by Penguin Books under their Puffin Books imprint, Ickypedia (2015), Ickyfoodia (2017)  and most recently The Listies' Teleportaloo.

Early Years
Higgins and Kelly met performing at student theatre at Melbourne's RMIT University though neither were students of the university at the time. They were performing in Just Disgusting, adapted from an Andy Griffiths book by Director in residence Lynne Ellis. "In that very first rehearsal, our scenes got longer and longer," says Kelly. They performed in The Day My Bum Went Psycho next, then Roald Dahl's The Twits". "

Style
Inspired by 'straight guy, funny guy' double acts such as Lano and Woodley, and the sketch comedy of the Goons and Monty Python, the Listies make two-handers which rely on wordplay, prop gags and slapstick, with a "mix of clowning and gross-out humour, general mischief with manic theatrical surprises...(with) a smattering of Easter eggs for the adults in the audience." Their comedy style has also been described as having a "focus on the subversion of the adult desire for control" and as being "unapologetically puerile,"

List of Stage Works
 "The List Operators" 2008-2011
 "The List Operators for Kids: More Fun than a Wii!" 2010-12
 "Art+Sport=Yeah!" 2012
 "The List Operators for Kids do Compooters" 2011
 "Earworms" 2013
 "The Listies Ruin Xmas" 2015- current
 "The Listies 6D (Twice as Good as 3D)" 2013-2017
 "The Listies Make You LOL!" 2014-2017
 "Hamlet: Prince of Skidmark" 2016- current
 "Ickypedia" 2017- 2019
 "The Listies Go For Bronze" 2018
 "R.O.F.L.S.H.A.L.B.O.W.C.O (Rolling On The Floor Laughing So Hard A Little Bit Of Wee Comes Out)" 2019- current
 "The Listies Make Some Noise" 2022- current

List of Publications
 "Ickypedia: A Dictionary of Disgusting New Words" 2015
 "Ickyfoodia: A Ultimate Guide to Disgusting Food" 2017
 "The Listies' Teleportaloo" 2021
 "The Listies' Big Number Two" 2022

List of Sketch Comedy Albums
 "The Listies Drive U Crazy" (2012)
 "The Listies Go Bananas" (2015)
  "The Listies' Lollaby"
 "The Listies Musical Owl Bum"

Television Shows
 'The Listies Work For Peanuts' ABC ME (Episodes: All)
 'Art Blast' ABC ME (Episodes: All)
 'Stand And Deliver' ABC ME (Episodes: The Listies)

References

Australian male comedians
Australian children's writers
Children's sketch comedy
Australian comedians